Keratoderma is a hornlike skin condition.

Classification 
The keratodermas are classified into the following subgroups:

Congenital
 Simple keratodermas
 Diffuse palmoplantar keratodermas
 Diffuse epidermolytic palmoplantar keratoderma
 Diffuse nonepidermolytic palmoplantar keratoderma
 mal de Meleda
 Focal palmoplantar keratoderma
 Striate palmoplantar keratoderma
 Punctate palmoplantar keratoderma
 Keratosis punctata palmaris et plantaris
 Spiny keratoderma
 Focal acral hyperkeratosis
 Complex keratodermas
 Diffuse palmoplantar keratoderma
 Erythrokeratodermia variabilis
 Palmoplantar keratoderma of Sybert
 Olmsted syndrome
 Naegeli–Franceschetti–Jadassohn syndrome
 Focal palmoplantar keratoderma
 Papillon–Lefèvre syndrome
 Pachyonychia congenita type I
 Pachyonychia congenita type II
 Focal palmoplantar keratoderma with oral mucosal hyperkeratosis
 Camisa disease
 Ectodermal dysplasias
 Clouston's hidrotic ectodermal dysplasia
 Acrokeratotic poikiloderma
 Dermatopathic pigmentosa reticularis
 Syndromic keratodermas
 Vohwinkel syndrome
 Palmoplantar keratoderma associated with esophageal cancer
 Palmoplantar keratoderma and spastic paraplegia
 Naxos disease
 Striate palmoplantar keratoderma, woolly hair, and left ventricular dilated cardiomyopathy
 Keratitis-ichthyosis-deafness syndrome
 Corneodermatosseous syndrome
 Huriez syndrome
 Oculocutaneous tyrosinemia
 Cardiofaciocutaneous syndrome
 Schöpf–Schulz–Passarge syndrome

Acquired
 Acquired keratodermas
 AIDS-associated keratoderma
 Arsenical keratoses
 Calluses
 Climacteric keratoderma
 Clavi (Corns)
 Eczema
 Human papillomavirus
 Keratoderma blenorrhagicum
 Lichen planus
 Norwegian scabies
 Paraneoplastic keratoderma
 Psoriasis
 Reactive arthritis
 Secondary syphilis
 Tinea pedis
 Sézary syndrome
 Tuberculosis verrucosa cutis
 Drug-induced keratoderma

See also
 Palmoplantar keratoderma
 Skin lesion
 List of cutaneous conditions
 List of conditions caused by problems with junctional proteins

References

External links 

Papulosquamous hyperkeratotic cutaneous conditions